

The Hopfner HV-3/27 was a small airliner built in Austria in the late 1920s. A development of the HV-2, it was a conventional, high-wing cantilever monoplane with a fully enclosed cabin and a strong resemblance to the contemporary Fokker F.II. A single example was built in 1927 and used by Hopfner's own airline until 1934.

Specifications

References

Further reading

External links
 Уголок неба

1920s Austrian airliners
Hopfner aircraft
Aircraft first flown in 1927
High-wing aircraft
Single-engined tractor aircraft